Wuzetka (pronounced  ) is a chocolate sponge and cream pie which originated in Warsaw, Poland. Its name is probably derived from the Warsaw W-Z Route, on which the confectionery that first began to sell the dessert in late 1940s was located. Traditional to Varsovian cuisine, the dessert was exclusively served by cafés and restaurants in Warsaw, but soon became a beloved home-made food in Poland.

History
The dessert most likely originated at the turn of the 1940s and 1950s in one of Warsaw's newly founded sweet shops. However, the precise origin of the name is debatable; historians and certain sources agree that the cake was probably named after the Warsaw W-Z Route (East-West Route), which ran next to the shop. Other sources state that the name comes from the acronym "WZC", which either stood for the Warsaw Confectionery Plants or for the Polish term "pastry with chocolate". The abbreviation "WZK" for "pastry with cream" is also a possibility.

The confectionery store was most likely situated somewhere near or in the "Kino Muranów" cinema building on 5 Andersa Street, in the Muranów district of Warsaw.

Preparation
The two square chocolate layers of the cake are made of wheat flour, eggs, sugar and cocoa. The mixture is baked in the oven at 180 degrees Celsius (356 degrees Fahrenheit) for 20–30 minutes. The baked layers are then dipped and soaked in punch. The top layer is thinly covered in marmalade, powidl or jam, followed by thick chocolate pomade coating. The cream filling is made of a 36% whipping cream, powdered sugar and gelatin. The pie is traditionally topped with a whipped cream twirl.

See also
 List of Polish desserts
 Napoleonka
 Karpatka
__notoc__

References

Cakes
Sweet pies
Polish desserts
Chocolate desserts